William Perrin may refer to:

 William Perrin (convict) (1831–1903) convict transported to Western Australia, later a school teacher
 William Perrin (bishop) (1848–1934), Anglican bishop
 William Gordon Perrin (1874–1931), R.A.F. and Navy officer
Bill Perrin, baseball player
 William F. Perrin (born 1938), American biologist

See also
William Perring
William Perrins